This is a record of Israel at the 1991 World Championships in Athletics.

Women's 200 metres

Qualifying heats

Quarterfinals

Semifinals

Women's 400 metres

Qualifying heats

Men's 20 kilometres walk

Men's triple jump

Qualifying round

Men's discus throw

Men's javelin throw

Qualifying round - Group B

Final round

Nations at the 1991 World Championships in Athletics
World Championships in Athletics
1991